Aafke Hament  (born 6 February 1971) is a Dutch volleyball player who was part of the Netherlands women's national volleyball team.

She represented her native country at 1992 Olympic Games Barcelona, and the 1994 FIVB Women's Volleyball World Championship. On club level she played with Schweriner SC.

Clubs
 Schweriner SC (1994)

References

External links
 
 http://volleyball.de/uploads/media/Ranglisten_1994_-_Frauen.pdf

1971 births
Living people
Dutch women's volleyball players
Sportspeople from Amsterdam
Expatriate volleyball players in Germany
Dutch expatriate sportspeople in Germany
Olympic volleyball players of the Netherlands
Volleyball players at the 1992 Summer Olympics
20th-century Dutch women
21st-century Dutch women